John Henry Jowett CH (25 August 1864 – 19 December 1923) was an influential British Protestant preacher at the turn of the nineteenth to the twentieth century who wrote books on topics related to Christian living. Warren W. Wiersbe called him "The greatest preacher in the English speaking world."

Early life 
Jowett was born 25 August 1864 at Beaumont Town, Northowram in Halifax, West Yorkshire to working-class parents who attended the Congregational church in Halifax. Jowett's father was a tailor and draper.

Career and influence 
Jowett was influenced by Enoch Mellor who was incumbent at Square Road Congregational Church, Halifax, between 1867 and 1881, and determined to become a preacher.

Jowett understood the problems faced by workers and while the pastor at Carr's Lane Congregational Church in Birmingham, England, founded the Digbeth Institute, now an arts center. While at Carr's Lane Jowett was elected chairman of the Congregational Union and president of the National Council of Evangelical Free Churches.

Jowett served at the Presbyterian Church, Fifth Avenue, New York, from 1911 to 1918, then Westminster Chapel from 1918 to 1922, when he retired due to ill-health, and died the following year.

In the 1922 Dissolution Honours as suggested by David Lloyd George to King George V, Jowett was made one of the 50 Companions of Honour, along with Winston Churchill.

Published works 
Jowett was the author of numerous books on Christian devotion, preaching, and the Bible.

Devotional books
 Jowett, J. H. The Folly of Unbelief : and Other Meditations for Quiet Moments.
 Jowett, J. H. (1905). Yet Another Day; A Prayer for Every Day of the Year. New York,: F.H. Revell Company.
 Jowett, J. H. (1913). Things that Matter Most; Devotional Papers. New York,: F.H. Revell.
 Jowett, J. H. (1914). My Daily Meditation for the Circling Year. Nashville, Tenn.: Broadman Press.
 Jowett, J. H. (1916). The whole armour of God. New York, Chicago [etc.] Fleming H. Revell company.
 Jowett, J. H. (1920). "Come Ye Apart", Daily exercises in Prayer and Devotion. New York,: Revell.
 Jowett, J. H. (1923). Brooks by the Traveller's Way; 26 Weeknight Addresses. New York,: Christian Herald.

Works on the Bible
 Jowett, J. H. (1902). Thirsting for the Springs Twenty-six weeknight meditations.
 Jowett, J. H. (1906). The Epistles of St. Peter. New York,: Armstrong.
 Jowett, J. H. (1909). The High Calling Meditations on St. Paul's Letter to the Philippians. New York: Fleming H. Revell.
 Jowett, J. H. The Redeemed Family of God, Studies in the Epistles of Peter. New York,: Hodder.
 Jowett, J. H. (1922). The Friend on the road and other studies in the Gospels. New York,: George H. Doran company.
 Jowett, J. H. (1925). Life in the Heights; Studies in the Epistles.
 Jowett, J. H. (1924). Springs in the Desert; Studies in the Psalms. New York,: George H. Doran Company.
 Jowett, J. H. (1922). The Eagle Life and Other Studies in the Old Testament. New York,: George H. Doran company.

Books of sermons and books on preaching and on the church
 Jowett, J. H. (1901). Apostolic Optimism, and Other Sermons.
 Jowett, J. H. (1905). The Passion for Souls. New York, Chicago: Fleming H. Revell Co.
 Jowett, J. H. (1910). The Transfigured Church. New York,: Fleming H. Revell Co.
 Jowett, J. H. (1912). The Preacher, His Life and Work.  Yale Lectures. New York: Harper & Brothers.

References

External links
 
 

1864 births
1923 deaths
British Protestants
British Christian writers
People from Northowram
Members of the Order of the Companions of Honour